The Stardust Best Director is chosen by the readers of the annual Stardust magazine. The award honors a director that has made an impact, introduced in the year 2009. Here is a list of the award winners and the films for which they won.

References

Stardust Awards